Janat is a French Tea Company established in 1872 and based in the 15th arrondissement of Paris, France. Founded by Janat Dores, it currently produces and sells tea.

History 
Janat Dores would have travelled from the port of Marseille to parts of the new world to bring back an assortment of tea, spices, cocoa, and coffee. In 1889, the opening of the Eiffel Tower established Janat Dores tea business even further with the friendship with Gustave Eiffel developed. The friendship inspired Janat Dores to create various tea brewing techniques which drove the brand to develop the world's first oak barrel through tea ageing and flavouring.

Femmes du Monde 
The company is very involved in the empowerment of women entrepreneurship. Janat Paris started a partnership with “Femmes du Monde”, a foundation that aims to improve the working conditions of tea leaf pickers, and to develop female independence.  

In 2016, the brand launched a program called “Tea for Two” in Tokyo. The scope of the project is to bring awareness on women empowerment. A free cup of tea is offered to women from each and every Janat Paris tea product purchased. To help develop this project, Janat uses its branded Yellow Tea Caravan and travels to Paris, Bahrain, Dubai and Tokyo. Janat also participates regularly in events such as The Yosakoi Oedo Soran Festival in 2016, the Hope and Love Day in 2016, and a concert with Jeff Mills in 2017.

Distribution 
Janat distributes its tea mostly through its two tea shops and the Yellow Tea Caravan. The brand opened its first tea shop in Paris, at a 20-minute walking distance from the Eiffel Tower, and another tea shop in Tokyo, in Omotesandō avenue.

Awards 
Several products from Janat received awards from the International Taste Institute:

References 

French companies established in 1872
Tea companies of France
Food and drink companies established in 1872